Juraj Kadnár (born 5 September 1972 in Bratislava, Karlova Ves) is a Czechoslovak-Slovak sprint canoer who competed in the early to mid-1990s. He won a bronze medal in the K-2 10000m event at the 1991 ICF Canoe Sprint World Championships in Paris for Czechoslovakia.

Kadnár also competed in three Summer Olympics, earning his best finish of fourth  in the K-4 1000 m event at Barcelona in 1992, also for Czechoslovakia.
He earned gold, silver and bronze medals on European Championships.

Juraj Kadnár graduated from the Comenius University in Bratislava, Slovakia - The Faculty of Physical Education and Sports.

References

Sports-reference.com profile

1972 births
Canoeists at the 1992 Summer Olympics
Canoeists at the 1996 Summer Olympics
Czechoslovak male canoeists
Living people
Olympic canoeists of Czechoslovakia
Olympic canoeists of Slovakia
Slovak male canoeists
ICF Canoe Sprint World Championships medalists in kayak